Fred Farrar (born 11 November 1882 – death unknown), also known by the nickname of "The Farsley Flyer", was an English professional rugby league footballer who played in the 1900s and 1910s.

Background
Fred Farrar was born in Farsley, Leeds, West Riding of Yorkshire, England, he was a boot and shoe merchant.

Playing career

International honours
Fred Farrar was selected for Great Britain while at Hunslet for the 1910 Great Britain Lions tour of Australia and New Zealand.

Fred Farrar was a reserve to travel for England against New Zealand, and had been previously complimented on his length-of-the field try for Hunslet against Leeds at Headingley Rugby Stadium by Hercules Richard "Bumper" Wright who was watching his first British rugby league match.

County honours
Fred Farrar won caps for Yorkshire including against New Zealand at Belle Vue, Wakefield on Wednesday 18 December 1907, and Australia.

Challenge Cup Final appearances
Fred Farrar played , i.e. number 2, and scored a try in Hunslet's 14-0 victory over Hull F.C. in the 1908 Challenge Cup Final during the 1907–08 season at Fartown Ground, Huddersfield on Saturday 25 April 1908, in front of a crowd of 18,000.

County Cup Final appearances
Fred Farrar played , i.e. number 2, in Hunslet's 17-0 victory over Halifax in the 1907 Yorkshire County Cup Final during the 1907–08 season at Headingley Rugby Stadium, Leeds on Saturday 21 December 1907.

All Four Cups
Fred Farrar was a member of Hunslet's 1907–08 All Four Cups winning team.

Outside of rugby league
Fred Farrar appeared in an advertising campaign for Zam-Buk, a herbal balm and antiseptic ointment. It was a patent medicine produced by the Zam-Buk Company of Leeds, England .

Genealogical information
Fred Farrar's marriage to Eliza (née Stead) was registered during third ¼ 1906 in North Bierley (Bradford) district. They had children; Frank S. Farrar (birth registered during fourth ¼ 1911 in Wharfedale district), and Doris M. Farrar (birth registered during fourth ¼ 1914 in Wharfedale district).

References

External links
!Great Britain Statistics at englandrl.co.uk (statistics currently missing due to not having appeared for both Great Britain, and England)
(archived by web.archive.org) Hunslet's Greatest Season
Search for "Fred Farrar" at britishnewspaperarchive.co.uk

1882 births
Bramley RLFC players
English rugby league players
Great Britain national rugby league team players
Hunslet F.C. (1883) players
Keighley Cougars players
People from Bramley, Leeds
Place of death missing
Rugby league players from Leeds
Rugby league wingers
Year of death missing
Yorkshire rugby league team players